Rinovia Steam Fishing Company Ltd. was a large fishing company operating from Grimsby, Lincolnshire, England. It specialized in deep-water fishing in the Icelandic grounds, and was responsible for handling Icelandic vessels landing their catch in Grimsby. It was also closely associated with the Icelandic consulate in Grimsby. Its trawlers bore a logo consisting of the fluttering flag of Iceland on their grey funnel.

Business history

The firm was founded in the 1930s by J.R. ("Joe") Cobley and Paul Adalsteinsson MBE (director also of Abunda Fishing Co.), and had close associations with N. Rogers and T. Little. Several of its trawlers were requisitioned by the Royal Navy in World War II for minesweeping duties and were lost, most notably the first Rinovia, a well-known wreck on The Manacles off Falmouth, Cornwall. Most of the ships (but not the Rinovia itself) bore the names of coastal locations in Iceland.

The company had a subsidiary in Grimsby, Thickett's, which made specialized fishing equipment such as trawl boards.

The firm was absorbed by the major fishing and food company The Ross Group in 1960-1, and the ships continued to fish in the Ross fleet. The historic name lived on in Rinovia Building, Farringdon Road, Fish Docks, Grimsby, which formerly housed its offices, but this has now been demolished.

Record catch

Grimsby's first £1m annual catch was brought home by skipper Paul Adalsteinsson MBE of the Andanes (see below).

Known trawlers of the firm

References
Ekberg, Charles (1984) Grimsby fish. Buckingham: Barracuda, esp. pp. 90, 98, 111.
The company's minutes, ledgers and plans (1941-75) are deposited in North-East Lincolnshire archives, Grimsby.
Oral history recording: Mr J.R. Cobley of Grimsby and Healing, interviewed by J.A.S. Green [1979-1979], North-East Lincolnshire archives, ref. 292/37A,38A

History of fishing
Companies based in Grimsby